Francis Adams (1796 – 26 February 1861) was a Scottish medical doctor and translator of Greek medical works.

Adams had a practice in Banchory, Aberdeenshire, from 1819 to 1861. Because there were no English translations of the medical tracts of the Greek, Roman, and Arabian doctors, Adams undertook many translations himself, which were widely published.

Works
 Doctissimus medicorum Britannorum

References

External links

Works by Hippocrates – written in 400 BC, by Hippocrates, translated by Francis Adams

19th-century Scottish medical doctors
Greek–English translators
Scottish translators
1796 births
1861 deaths
19th-century British translators
Translators of Ancient Greek texts
People from Banchory